This is a list of ukulele players. These musicians and bands are well known for playing the ukulele as their primary instrument and have an associated linked Wikipedia article. It is not intended for everyone that can play the instrument.

A 

 Danielle Anderson (aka Danielle Ate the Sandwich)
 Zee Avi

B 
 Jacob Batalon
 Sara Bareilles
 Jim Beloff
 Jón Þór Birgisson, more commonly known as Jónsi
 Petty Booka
 May Singhi Breen
 Joe Brown
 Sam Brown

C 
 Graeme Cairns
 Dan "Soupy" Campbell
 Billy "Uke" Carpenter
 Jason Castro
 Ryan Choi (musician)
 Jacob Collier
 Zach Condon (Beirut)
 Frank Crumit
 Albert "Sonny" Cunha

D 
 J. Chalmers Doane
 Zooey Deschanel

E 
 Andy Eastwood
 Billie Eilish
 Cliff Edwards ("Ukulele Ike")

F 
 Wayne Federman
 Tom Fletcher
 George Formby Jr.

G 
 Merrill Garbus
 Taimane Gardner
 Imua Garza (Opihi Pickers)
 Arthur Godfrey
 Roger Greenawalt

H 
 Wendell Hall
 George Harrison
 Greg Hawkes
 The Hazzards
 James Hill
 Daniel Ho
 Don Ho
 Sol Hoʻopiʻi
 Honoka & Azita

I 
 Ingrid Michaelson
 Israel Kamakawiwoʻole

J 
 Aidan James
 Joji, mostly only in his earlier works

K 
 Ernest Ka'ai
 Kaʻau Crater Boys
 Harry Kalahiki
 Eddie Kamae
 Israel Kamakawiwoʻole
 Queen Lili'uokalani Kamakaʻeha
 Kaplan Kaye
 Buster Keaton
 Genoa Keawe
 John King
 The King Blues
 Richard W. Konter

L 
 Gabby La La
 Langley Ukulele Ensemble
 John Lennon
 Molly Lewis
 LP

M 
 William H. Macy
 Sophie Madeleine
 Dent May
 Paul McCartney
 Nellie McKay
 Kate Micucci
 Bette Midler
 Joni Mitchell
 Peter Moon
 Bina Mossman
 Jason Mraz
mxmtoon

N 
 King Ben Nawahi
 New York Ukulele Ensemble
 Noah and the Whale
 Julia Nunes

O 
 Yōko Oginome
 Herb Ohta
 Tessie O'Shea
 Erlend Øye

P 
 Amanda Palmer
 Elvis Presley
 Age Pryor

R 
 Lil' Rev
 Lyle Ritz
 Gerald Ross
 Ridh Fiza, Birbhum District

S 
 Buffy Sainte-Marie
 Roy Sakuma
 Luthea Salom
 Max Schneider
 Billy "Uke" Scott
 Peter Sellers
 Christopher Sembroski
 Jake Shimabukuro
 Frank Sinatra
 Frank Skinner
 Roy Smeck
 Rebecca Sugar
 Jimmy Stafford (Train)
 Sarah Stiles
 Heidi Swedberg
 Taylor Swift

T 
 Bill Tapia
 Tiny Tim
 Rachel Trachtenburg
 Ayano Tsuji
Tiki King
 Tyler Joseph

U 
 Ukulele Orchestra of Great Britain

V 
 Eddie Vedder (Pearl Jam)
 Grace VanderWaal
 Victoria Vox
 Vance Joy

W 
 Walk Off the Earth
 Wild Child
 Wellington International Ukulele Orchestra
 Ian Whitcomb
 Patrick Wolf

See also

Lists of musicians

References

Ukulele